Majūs (Arabic: مجوس) or Magūs (Persian: مگوش) was originally a term meaning Zoroastrians (and specifically, Zoroastrian priests). It was a technical term, meaning magus, and like its synonym gabr (of uncertain etymology) originally had no pejorative implications. It is also translated as "fire worshipper".

The term is originated from the Persian word Magūsh (Persian: مگوش), then translated into the Greek language pronounced as Magoi (Greek: μάγοι), then to (Roman Latin: Magūs) which has mentioned in Matthew 2. The arabs pronounced the word in Majūs (Arabic: مجوس) due to lack of G letter in the arabic alphabet (like G in the word Gate). The word is mentioned in the Quran at 22:17 which says "Indeed, those who have believed and those who were Jews and the Sabians and the Christians and the Magians and those who associated with Allah - Allah will judge between them on the Day of Resurrection. Indeed Allah is, over all things, Witness".

They are also mentioned by Ibn al-Jawzi in his famous work Talbis Iblis (The Devil's Deceptions).,

The term was also used to describe the vikings.

In the 1980s, majus was part of Iraqi propaganda vocabulary of the Iran–Iraq War to refer to Iranians in general. "By referring to the Iranians in these documents as majus, the security apparatus [implied] that the Iranians [were] not sincere Muslims, but rather covertly practice their pre-Islamic beliefs. Thus, in their eyes, Iraq’s war took on the dimensions of not only a struggle for Arab nationalism, but also a campaign in the name of Islam."

Today the term majus is distinct from Arabic kafir "unbeliever". Persian gabr is no longer synonymous with majus. Subsequent usage by Sunnis against Shiites has meant that some people view the term as Anti Shia.

See also
 ajam, "illiterate", non-Arab, Iranian
 ahl al-Kitab, "People of the Book"
 dhimmi, "protected"
 Irani
 kafir, "unbeliever"
 Zoroastrians in Iran

References

Arabic words and phrases
Zoroastrianism
Religious slurs for people
Anti-Iranian sentiments
Racism in the Arab world
Anti-Shi'ism
Magi